Events from the year 1558 in Ireland.

Incumbent
Monarch: Mary I (until 17 November), then Elizabeth I

Events
November 17 – the Protestant Elizabeth I succeeds as Queen of England and Ireland upon the death of her Catholic half-sister Mary I. The Elizabethan Religious Settlement follows.
Sorley Boy MacDonnell obtains lordship of the clan territory in Antrim from James MacDonald, 6th of Dunnyveg.

Births

Deaths
Autumn – Richard St Lawrence, 7th Baron Howth, nobleman and soldier (b. c.1510)
October 27 – James FitzGerald, 14th Earl of Desmond.
November 17 – Mary I, Queen of Ireland (b. 1516)
Thomas Butler, 1st Baron Cahir.
Matthew O'Neill, 1st Baron Dungannon was assassinated
Colla MacDonnell, Lord of Islay and Kintyre (Cantire), died at Kinbane Castle

References

 
1550s in Ireland
Ireland
Years of the 16th century in Ireland